Ulbricht is a German surname. Notable people with this name include:

Beate Ulbricht (1944–1991), Soviet adopted daughter of Walter and Lotte Ulbricht
Catherine Ulbricht, American pharmacist 
Julian Ulbricht (born 1999), German footballer
Lotte Ulbricht (1903–2002), East-German communist politician, second wife of Walter Ulbricht
Lutz Ulbricht (born 1942), German Olympic rower
Manfred Ulbricht (born 1947), German cyclist
Ross Ulbricht (born 1984), owner of the online black market Silk Road and the person behind the pseudonym "Dread Pirate Roberts"
Sigrid Ulbricht (born 1958), German long jumper
Thomas Ulbricht (born 1985), German paralympian
Walter Ulbricht (1893–1973), East-German communist politician

See also

German-language surnames
Surnames of German origin
Surnames from given names